The Legend of Korra comics are a continuation of the Nickelodeon animated television series The Legend of Korra, created by Michael Dante DiMartino and Bryan Konietzko. It is set after the series finale, and follows  Avatar Korra and Asami Sato on their relationship. The comics are published by Dark Horse Comics, alongside Avatar: The Last Airbender.

Short stories
The short comics appeared in the Free Comic Book Day issues.

Graphic novel trilogies
A continuation for The Legend of Korra, the story for the comic books were set after the television series.

Library edition hardcover
Material of the original graphic novels were collected in an oversized library edition featuring notes from the creators and a sketchbook section.

References

External links
 Dark Horse Comics

Comics
Comics based on television series
Dark Horse Comics titles
Fantasy comics
LGBT-related comics